Dr. C.V. Raman University, Khandwa is a private university located at the village Balkhandsura, near the Khandwa-Indore road, in Khandwa district, Madhya Pradesh, India. The university was established in 2018 by the All India Society for Electronics & Computer Technology (AISECT) under the Madhya Pradesh Niji Vishwavidyalay (Sthapana Evam Sanchalan) Sanshodhan Adhiniyam, 2018, an Act which also established Shri Krishna University and Sardar Patel University Balaghat. The university offers various diploma, undergraduate and postgraduate courses in seven faculties. It is named after India physicist C. V. Raman.

Academics
The institute offers diploma, undergraduate and postgraduate courses through seven faculties:
 Faculty of Arts
 Faculty of Agriculture
 Faculty of Fine Arts
 Faculty of Commerce
 Faculty of Computer Science and IT
 Faculty of Management
 Faculty of Science

References

External links

Khandwa district
Universities in Madhya Pradesh
Educational institutions established in 2018
2018 establishments in Madhya Pradesh
Private universities in India